Csaba Bálint is a Hungarian former ice dancer. With Judit Péterfy, he is the 1980 World Junior silver medalist and a two-time Hungarian national champion (1982–1983). The duo finished in the top ten at the 1981 European Championships in Innsbruck, Austria; 1982 European Championships in Lyon, France; and 1983 European Championships in Dortmund, West Germany.

Péterfy/Bálint also competed at two World Championships, placing 14th in 1981 (Hartford, Connecticut, United States) and 13th in 1983 (Helsinki, Finland). They were coached by Ilona Berecz.

Bálint has served as an ISU judge and international referee for ice dancing.

Competitive highlights 
With Péterfy

References 

20th-century births
Hungarian male ice dancers
Living people
World Junior Figure Skating Championships medalists
Figure skating judges
Year of birth missing (living people)